Juliette is a feminine given name. It may also refer to:

 Juliette (novel), also known as L'Histoire de Juliette, novel written by the Marquis de Sade
 Juliette (TV series), a long-running Canadian musical-variety TV series
 Juliette, Georgia, an unincorporated community in the United States
 "Juliette" (Shinee song), a song on the EP Romeo
 "Juliette" (Little Feat song), a song on the album Dixie Chicken 
 Hurricane Juliette, tropical cyclones named Juliette
 Juliette, a brand name for the Ethinylestradiol/cyproterone acetate birth control pill
 Juliette (butterfly), also known as Eueides aliphera

See also
"Juliette & Jonathan", a 1990s pop song
Juliette and the Licks, American rock band led by actress Juliette Lewis
"Mademoiselle Juliette", song by French singer Alizée
Juliett (disambiguation)
Juliet (disambiguation)
Joliet (disambiguation)
Joliette (disambiguation)